Trebil or Tarbil is a border town in the Al Anbar Governorate of Iraq, on the Iraq-Jordan border. The Karameh Border Crossing near Trebil is the primary border crossing point between Iraq and Jordan.

References
Jon Elmer, "On Iraq–Jordan Border, Various Roles Play Out in Desert", New Standard News, 2005-07-13.

Populated places in Al Anbar Governorate